Vijay Rupani was first time sworn in as chief minister of Gujarat in 2016. Here is the list of ministers:

Cabinet Ministers 

|}

Ministers of state 

|}

Rupani
Rupani I
2016 establishments in Gujarat
Cabinets established in 2016